Raorchestes chromasynchysi, also known as the confusing green bushfrog or confusing green bush frog, is a species of frog found in the Western Ghats of Kerala and Karnataka in India.

References

External links

chromasynchysi
Frogs of India
Endemic fauna of the Western Ghats
Amphibians described in 2009